Level 2 or Level II may refer to:

Technology
 level 2 cache, a type of cache computer memory
 Level 2, a level of automation in a self-driving car (see Autonomous car#Classification)
 A NASDAQ price quotation service
 Level II, the full and raw dataset from the U.S. National Weather Service's WSR-88D weather radar
 Level 2, one of the levels in system support
 Biosafety level 2, a laboratory grade
 Level 2 market data

Music
 Level II (Eru album), 2006
 Level II (Blackstreet album), 2003
 Level 2 (Last Chance to Reason album), 2011
 Level 2 (Animal X album), 2001

Other
 Level II, a skatepark located in the upstairs of the Dee Stadium in Houghton, Michigan
 "Level Two" (Arrow), an episode of Arrow
 Level 2 coronavirus restrictions, see COVID-19 pandemic in Scotland#Levels System

 STANAG 4569 protection level